Hakea florida is a shrub in the family Proteacea. It is endemic to an area along the south coast in the South West, Great Southern and Goldfields-Esperance regions of Western Australia.

Description
Profuse blooms appear from October to January and produces strongly scented white-cream flowers in the leaf axils. The sharp pointed leaves are sparse, widely spaced, thick and linear-lanceolate with a central vein. A very showy shrub in full bloom.

Taxonomy and naming
Hakea florida was first formally described in 1810 by Robert Brown and the description was published in Transactions of the Linnean Society of London. It is named from the Latin fluorides-many flowered, referring to the profuse showy flowers.

Distribution and habitat
Occurs from Manjimup south coast to Denmark east to the Fitzgerald River National Park. Hakea florida grows on sand, loam, clayey sand, gravel, laterite and granite. May be grown in sun or semi-shade, it is frost and drought tolerant.

Conservation status
Hakea florida is classified as "not threatened" by the Western Australian Government.

References

florida
Eudicots of Western Australia
Plants described in 1810
Taxa named by Robert Brown (botanist, born 1773)